The shvi ("whistle", pronounced sh-vee) is an Armenian fipple flute with a labium mouth piece.

The shvi is up to 12 inches in length and is made of reed, bark of willows, or walnut wood. It has 8 holes on the front, 7 of which are used while playing, and one thumbhole. One octave is obtained by blowing normally into the shvi and a second octave is attained by blowing with slightly more force (i.e., overblowing). The lower octave has a timbre similar to a recorder whereas the higher octave sounds similar to a piccolo or flute. 8-hole traditional flute. The shvi is played with the mouth. Typically, most Armenian duduk or zurna players learn the shvi before moving on to either instrument.

See also
Salamuri
Dilli kaval
Kaval (Blul)
Duduk
Sring

Notes

References
Ararat Petrossian - "Melody of Sunik", Aya Sofia Records, 1995.
Nor Dar - "Opus of the Lizard", Libra Music, 1997.
Tamar Eskenian
Various Artists - "Kalaschjan - Rural and Urban Traditional Music from Armenia", Weltmusic, 1992.
Soviet Music and Society Under Lenin and Stalin By Neil Edmunds

External links
Shvi information at Tripod.com
 More Shvi info at Geocities.com

Armenian musical instruments
Internal fipple flutes